Iakovos Psaltis (born 1935) is a Greek weightlifter. He competed in the men's light heavyweight event at the 1960 Summer Olympics.

References

1935 births
Living people
Greek male weightlifters
Olympic weightlifters of Greece
Weightlifters at the 1960 Summer Olympics
Sportspeople from Alexandria